Falgun or Phalgun or Phagun is the eleventh month of the year in the Bengali calendar, the Assamese calendar, and the Nepali calendar. In the revision of the Bengali calendar used in Bangladesh since October 2019, the month has 29 days in common years or 30 in leap years of the Gregorian calendar. In the previous version of the calendar, used in Bangladesh from 1987 through October 2019, Falgun had 30 days in common years or 31 days in leap years. The month has 29 or 30 days, based on the true movements of the Sun, in the old non-reformed Bengali calendar, still used in West Bengal, and in the Nepali calendar.

Falgun was named for the nakshatra (lunar mansion) Uttara phalguni, in the vicinity of which the full moon appears at that time of the year. It marks the arrival of spring, the sixth and final season in Bangladesh, West Bengal, Assam, and Nepal. Falgun falls between mid-February and mid-March on the Gregorian calendar.

Observances
 Falgun 1 - Pahela Falgun (Bangladesh)
 Falgun 7 - Democracy Day (Nepal)
 Falgun 8 
 Language Martyrs' Day (Bangladesh)
 International Mother Language Day (Bangladesh, India)
 Falgun 12 - National Education Day (Nepal)
 Falgun 14 - Maha Shivaratri (India, Nepal)
 Falgun full moon - Dol Purnima (India), Holi (Bangladesh, India)

See also
 Bangla Calendar
 Culture of Bangladesh
 Culture of Nepal

References

External links
 

Months of the Bengali calendar